Li Xiaoxin (born October 1962) is a Chinese politician, currently serving as deputy head of the Organization Department of the Chinese Communist Party and director of the . 

Li is a representative of the 20th National Congress of the Chinese Communist Party and a member of the 20th Central Committee of the Chinese Communist Party.

Biography
Li was born in Yueyang, Hunan, in October 1962. After graduating from Hunan Agricultural University in 1983, she successively worked in the government of Miluo County (now Miluo) and the Organization Department of the CCP Hunan Provincial Committee. 

Li was assigned to the Organization Department of the Chinese Communist Party in October 2002, where she eventually becoming deputy head in August 2020.

References

1962 births
Living people
People from Yueyang
Hunan Agricultural University alumni
People's Republic of China politicians from Hunan
Chinese Communist Party politicians from Hunan
Members of the 20th Central Committee of the Chinese Communist Party